The Bharatiya Janata Party, or simply,  BJP Arunachal Pradesh (BJP;), 
is the state unit of the Bharatiya Janata Party of the Arunachal Pradesh. Its head office is situated at the State BJP Office Opp. Arunodaya School Vivek Vihar, Itanagar-791113, India. The current president of BJP Arunachal Pradesh is Biyuram Wahge.

History

Lok Sabha members

Rajya Sabha members

In General Election

In State Election

See also
Bharatiya Janata Party
National Democratic Alliance
North East Democratic Alliance
National People's Party

References

Arunachal Pradesh
Political parties in Arunachal Pradesh